The  San Diego Chargers season was the franchise's 35th season in the National Football League (NFL), its 45th overall and the third under head coach Marty Schottenheimer. It would be the first season the franchise would have involving quarterback Philip Rivers. The team improved on their 4–12 record in 2003 and finished the regular season 12–4, made the playoffs for the first time in nine years, and captured their first division title since the 1994 season. In the playoffs they lost in overtime to the New York Jets. At the end of the season Marty Schottenheimer was named NFL Coach of the Year.

Offseason

NFL draft 
Entering the draft, the consensus top pick was Ole Miss quarterback Eli Manning. However, Manning had said prior to the draft that he did not want to play for the Chargers and would not sign with them if he was drafted. The Chargers would strike a deal with the Giants before the draft that would shape the future of both franchises. The Chargers would select Manning first overall, as they had intended to. The Giants would then draft quarterback Philip Rivers of North Carolina State, and then swap him and two 2005 draft picks for Manning.

Personnel

Staff

Roster

Regular season

Schedule 

Note: Intra-division opponents are in bold text.

Standings

Game summaries

Week 1: at Houston Texans 

 Source:

Week 2: vs. New York Jets 

 Source:

Week 3: at Denver Broncos 

 Source:

Week 4: vs. Tennessee Titans 

 Source:

Week 5: vs. Jacksonville Jaguars 

 Source:

Week 6: at Atlanta Falcons 

 Source:

Week 7: at Carolina Panthers 

 Source:

Week 8: vs. Oakland Raiders 

 Source:

Week 9: vs. New Orleans Saints 

 Source:

Week 11: at Oakland Raiders 

 Source:

Week 12: at Kansas City Chiefs 

 Source:

Week 13: vs. Denver Broncos 

 Source:

Week 14: vs. Tampa Bay Buccaneers 

 Source:

Week 15: at Cleveland Browns 

 Source: 
    
    
    

San Diego clinches its first division title since 1994.

Week 16: at Indianapolis Colts 

 Source:

Week 17: vs. Kansas City Chiefs 

 Source:

Postseason

Game summaries

Wild Card: vs. New York Jets 

 Source:

See also 
 2004 NFL season

References 

San Diego Chargers
San Diego Chargers seasons
AFC West championship seasons
San Diego